Alevtina Viktorovna Aparina (20 April 1941 – 29 December 2013) was a Russian politician and member of the State Duma of the Russian Federation.

Biography
Aparina was born in Stalingrad on 20 April 1941. She graduated from Rostov State University in 1967. Alevtina Aparina studied philology at the university. In 1986 she graduated by correspondence from the Saratov . She began to work as a common worker in a sovkhoz. Aparina also worked as an accountant, a cattleman, pig-tender, and a poultry woman. Between 1965 and 1967 she was employed at middle school as Russian teacher.  Aparina had been elected as a deputy of the State Duma's fourth convocation on 7 December 2003. On 22 June 2012 she retired as general secretary of the Volgograd's Communist Party of the Russian Federation branch. She died from a grave illness in Volgograd (former Stalingrad) on 29 December 2013.

References

2013 deaths
1941 births
20th-century Russian women politicians
20th-century Russian politicians
Communist Party of the Soviet Union members
Communist Party of the Russian Federation members
First convocation members of the State Duma (Russian Federation)
Second convocation members of the State Duma (Russian Federation)
Third convocation members of the State Duma (Russian Federation)
Fourth convocation members of the State Duma (Russian Federation)
Fifth convocation members of the State Duma (Russian Federation)
Sixth convocation members of the State Duma (Russian Federation)
21st-century Russian women politicians
Southern Federal University alumni
Politicians from Volgograd